A whole-council election to Lancashire County Council took place on 4 June 2009 as part of the 2009 United Kingdom local elections. The United Kingdom government department Department for Communities and Local Government consulted on the issue of moving the elections to the same date as the 2009 European Parliament election, which resulted in the council elections being postponed to June to coincide. 84 councillors were elected for 84 divisions by first-past-the-post' for a four-year term of office. Wards were the same as those at the previous election in 2005. Elections are held in all electoral divisions across the present ceremonial county, excepting Blackpool, and Blackburn with Darwen which are unitary authorities in a similar way to Greater Manchester and most of Merseyside.

All locally registered electors (British, Irish, Commonwealth and European Union citizens) who were aged 18 or over on Thursday 4 June 2009 were entitled to vote in the local elections. Those who were temporarily away from their ordinary address (for example, away working, on holiday, in student accommodation or in hospital) were also entitled to vote in the local elections, although those who had moved abroad and registered as overseas electors cannot vote in the local elections. It is possible to register to vote at more than one address (such as a university student who had a term-time address and lives at home during holidays) at the discretion of the local Electoral Register Office, but it remains an offence to vote more than once in the same local government election.

Results

	
The overall turnout was 37.99% with a total of 336,261 valid votes cast. A total of 3,311 ballots were rejected.

Council composition
Following the last election in 2005, the composition of the council was:

After the election, the composition of the council was:

G - Green Party 
I - Independent 
IT - Idle Toad 
B - BNP

Ward results
An asterisk (*) denotes an incumbent seeking re-election.

Burnley

Burnley Central East

Burnley Central West

Burnley North East

Burnley Rural

Burnley South West

Padiham and Burnley West

Chorley

Chorley East

Chorley North

Chorley Rural East

Chorley Rural North

Chorley Rural West

Chorley South

Chorley West

Fylde

Fylde East

Fylde South

Flyde West

Lytham

St Annes North

St Annes South

Hyndburn

Accrington North

Accrington South

Accrington West

Great Harwood

Oswaldtwistle

Rishton and Clayton-le-Moors

Lancaster

Heysham

Lancaster Central

Lancaster East

Lancaster Rural East

Lancaster Rural North

Lancaster South East

Morecambe North

Morecambe South

Morecambe West

Skerton

Pendle

Brierfield and Nelson North

Nelson South

Pendle Central

Pendle East

Pendle West

West Craven

Preston

Preston Central North

Preston Central South

Preston City

Preston East

Preston North

Preston North East

Preston North West

Preston Rural

Preston South East

Preston West

Ribble Valley

Clitheroe

Longridge with Bowland

Ribble Valley North East

Ribble Valley South West

Rossendale

Rossendale East

Rossendale North

Rosendale South

Rosendale West

Whitworth

South Ribble

Bamber Bridge and Walton-le-Dale

Farington

Leyland Central

Leyland South West

Penwortham North

Penwortham South

South Ribble Rural East

South Ribble Rural West

West Lancashire

Ormskirk West

Skelmersdale Central

Skelmersdale East

Skelmersdale West

West Lancashire East

West Lancashire North

West Lancashire South

West Lancashire West

Wyre

Amounderness

Fleetwood East

Fleetwood West

Garstang

Poulton-le-Fylde

Thornton Cleveleys Central

Thornton Cleveleys North

Wyreside

References

2009 English local elections
2009
2000s in Lancashire